Michael Fenton (born 18 January 1972) is a retired three-time Group 1 winning jockey. 

He won the 2001 Oaks d'Italia on Zanzibar for Michael Bell and the 2005 Prix Royal Oak on Alcazar for Hughie Morrison, but his biggest victory was in May 2006 when he won the 1,000 Guineas on Speciosa.

Statistics

Flat wins in Great Britain by year

Major wins 
 Great Britain
1,000 Guineas Stakes - Speciosa (2006)
 France
Prix Royal Oak - Alcazar (2005)
 Italy
Oaks d'Italia - Zanzibar (2001)

References 

Jockeys
Living people
1972 births